Incaspis tachymenoides, Schmidt's green racer, is a species of snake in the family Colubridae.  The species is native to Chile and Peru.

References

Incaspis
Snakes of South America
Reptiles of Chile
Reptiles of Peru
Reptiles described in 1943
Taxa named by Karl Patterson Schmidt